Josip Friščić (15 August 1949 – 23 January 2016) was a Croatian politician. He was a leader of the Croatian Peasant Party (HSS) and vice president of Croatian Parliament from 2008.

Friščić joined the party in 1992 and subsequently established many local branches. After many years of active political work, he was elected as president of the party in 2005. His party was crucial to the formation of a center-right government after parliamentary elections in 2007. He resigned in 2012. He was suffering from a rare form of cancer, and died on 23 January 2016.

References

External links 

1949 births
2016 deaths
Representatives in the modern Croatian Parliament
Croatian Peasant Party politicians